Archbishop of Sydney may refer to:

Anglican Archbishop of Sydney
Catholic Bishops and Archbishops of Sydney, since 1842
Archdiocese of Sydney